João Carvalho (born 4 November 1950) is an Angolan long-distance runner. He competed in the men's marathon at the 1988 Summer Olympics.

References

External links
 

1950 births
Living people
Athletes (track and field) at the 1988 Summer Olympics
Angolan male long-distance runners
Angolan male marathon runners
Olympic athletes of Angola
Place of birth missing (living people)